Goodenia claytoniacea is a species of flowering plant in the family Goodeniaceae and is endemic to the south-west of Western Australia. It is an annual herb with lance-shaped leaves mostly at the base of the plant, yellow flowers arranged singly or in small groups, and oval fruit.

Description

Taxonomy and naming
Goodenia claytoniacea was first formally described in 1768 by George Bentham in Flora Australiensis from an unpublished description by Ferdinand von Mueller. Bentham apparently misread von Mueller's handwriting and gave the name G. laytoniana. The specific epithet (claytoniacea) refers to an apparent similarity to plants in the genus Claytonia.

Distribution and habitat
This goodenia grows in sandy soil in swampy areas in the Jarrah Forest, Swan Coastal Plain and Warren in the south-west of Western Australia.

Conservation status
Goodenia claytoniacea is classified as "not threatened" by the Western Australian Government Department of Parks and Wildlife.

References

claytoniacea
Eudicots of Western Australia
Plants described in 1868
Taxa named by Ferdinand von Mueller
Taxa named by George Bentham